Dimitrios Filindras (born 9 February 1973 in Larissa) is a retired Greek long jumper. He was selected to compete for the host nation Greece's largest Olympic team in the men's long jump at the 2004 Summer Olympics, and also trained throughout his athletics career for the sport club Pelasgos Larissas. In June 2003, Filindras recorded his best jump at 8.30 m from the Venizelia International Athletics Meet in Chania.

Filindras qualified for the Greek squad in the men's long jump at the 2004 Summer Olympics in Athens by successfully jumping an Olympic A-standard of 8.30 m from the Venizelia International Athletics Meet in Chania. Filindras started off abruptly with a foul, until he soared out to a legal leap at 7.45 m on his second attempt. Since his third jump was slightly shorter than his best by three centimetres, Filindras wound only to thirty-fifth spot in a field of forty-one athletes, and did not advance past the qualifying round.

References

External links

1973 births
Living people
Greek male long jumpers
Olympic athletes of Greece
Athletes (track and field) at the 2004 Summer Olympics
Athletes from Larissa